Saint George's College, founded in 1936 and run by the Congregation of Holy Cross, is a private school in Santiago, Chile. According to Seminarium Head Hunting, one third of the CEOs of the top 200 companies in Chile are graduates of the school.

History
Three Holy Cross priests arrived in Santiago, Chile, on March 1, 1943, at the invitation of José María Cardinal Caro, Archbishop of Santiago, to administer Saint George's College. Fathers William Havey, Alfred Send, and Joseph Doherty believed they were going to do university work, not knowing that "college" meant a school of first through 12th graders.

St. George's was the only private school in Chile to be taken over by military government following the September 1973 coup.  The Congregation returned to the school in 1986. 

Originally an all-boys school, Saint George's College was made co-educational in 1973. It was initially located in the Pedro de Valdivia part of Providencia, in 1970 it was relocated to Vitacura.

Its traditional rival schools are Colegio del Verbo Divino, Colegio San Ignacio and Colegio Manquehue which were originally located near one another in the Pedro de Valdivia neighborhood of Providencia. Its traditional sister school was Colegio Santa Úrsula ("Ursulinas"), which was originally next door to St. George's in Providencia.

A group of parents and teachers, dissatisfied with the Liberation Theology measures imposed by Father Gerard Whelan during the early 1970s, broke off in 1972 and formed Colegio Tabancura, an Opus Dei-run boys' school.

Notable alumni
José Miguel Insulza (Class of 1961) – Socialist politician, senator of the Arica y Parinacota Region since 2018.
Andrés Pascal Allende (Class of 1962) – Marxist revolutionary and nephew of Salvador Allende.
Andrés Wood (Class of 1983) – filmmaker; director and producer of Machuca.
Gonzalo Lira (Class of 1985) - filmmaker, author and blogger.
Marco Enríquez-Ominami (Class of 1990) – Progressive politician, member of the Chamber of Deputies from 2006 to 2010.

See also 
 Machuca, a 2004 movie connected to events at the school.

References

External links
Official site

Educational institutions established in 1936
Holy Cross secondary schools
Catholic schools in Chile
Buildings and structures in Santiago
Education in Santiago, Chile
1936 establishments in Chile